The Movie is a 2022 American comedy horror film directed by Michael Mandell, starring Bonnie Root and Jarrod Pistilli.

Cast
 Bonnie Root as Janet
 Jarrod Pistilli as Walter

Release
The film was released on digital platforms on 6 September 2022.

Reception
Michael Talbot-Haynes of Film Threat gave the film a score of 6.5/10 and wrote that the film has "one of the best performances by an actress showing the world what real agony looks like" despite being "soaked in controversy" and having "more triggers than a red-state gun show"

Martin Unsworth of Starburst rated the film 2 stars out of 5 and wrote that the film is a "well-made two-hander", which "makes the distasteful moments jar even more".

Film critic Andy Klein called the film "nasty" and "sadistic".

References

External links
 
 

American comedy horror films
2022 comedy horror films